Hibbertia circumdans is a species of flowering plant in the family Dilleniaceae and is endemic to New South Wales. It is an erect shrub with hairy branches, linear to wedge-shaped or spatula-shaped leaves, and yellow flowers arranged on short side shoots, with fifteen to thirty stamens arranged in groups around the three carpels.

Description
There are fifteen to thirty stamens arranged around three glabrous carpels. Flowering mostly occurs from August to November.

Taxonomy
Hibbertia circumdans was first formally described in 1990 by Barry Conn in the journal Muelleria from specimens collected by Ruurd Dirk Hoogland near Capertee in 1972. The specific epithet (circumdans) refers to the arrangement of the stamens around the carpels.

Distribution and habitat
This hibbertia grows in the shrub layer of woodland and forest between the Pilliga Scrub and Nadgee Nature Reserve in New South Wales.

See also
List of Hibbertia species

References

circumdans
Flora of New South Wales
Plants described in 1990
Taxa named by Barry John Conn